Andrea Moberg Tobies (born 4 June 1994) is a Peruvian model, activist and beauty queen, who will represent that country in the Miss Grand International 2018 contest.

Early life
She was born and raised in the city of Iquitos, the capital of the Department of Loreto, located in the Northern Jungle of Peru. She is currently a journalism student and activist for the human rights of low income families and also on the rights of women in the country.

Pageantry
On the night of 29 October 2017, Moberg represented Loreto in the national Miss Peru 2018 contest, which was held at the Municipal Theater of Lima. At the end of the contest she remains as 1st Finalist, losing to Romina Lozano from Callao and at the same time, she was given the title of Miss Grand Peru 2018 and also as Reina Rosa 2018 by Jessica Newton.

Miss Grand Peru 2018
On 6 February 2018, Moberg was officially crowned Miss Grand Peru 2018 by her predecessor María José Lora, Miss Grand International 2017 at the Country Club Hotel in Lima.

Miss Grand International 2018
Andrea Moberg will represent Peru in the international Miss Grand International 2018 contest on 25 October 2018 in Rangoon, Myanmar.

References

External links
 

1994 births
Living people
People from Iquitos
Peruvian female models
Peruvian beauty pageant winners
Peruvian people of Swedish descent
Peruvian people of German descent
Peruvian feminists
Peruvian women activists
Peruvian child models
Peruvian human rights activists
Women human rights activists